He-Man is a 2011 Chinese action comedy film directed by Ding Sheng. The film is a sequel to Ding Sheng's 2008 film The Underdog Knight. The plot is set in Qingdao, China where a discharged navy man Lao San (Liu Ye) is caught in the crossfire of a bank robbery. He becomes a crime-fighter for the city by working with the local police using his strong fighting techniques that he learned from his time with the navy.

Cast
Liu Ye
Zhang Zilin
Vincent Chiao
Yoo Seung-jun
Liu Hailong

Release
He-Man had its premiere on March 23, 2011 in Beijing. It received a wide release on April 1, 2011. The film took in RMB7.8 million ($1.2 million) over three days on its release in China.

Notes

External links
 The Underdog Knight: Heman Trailer
 

Chinese sequel films
Films set in China
Films shot in China
Films directed by Ding Sheng
2010s Mandarin-language films